Wirth Lake may refer to:

 Walter Wirth Lake, Salem, Oregon
 Wirth Lake (Minnesota)